The moth family Cosmopterigidae contains the following genera:

Acanthophlebia
Acleracra
Adeana
Aeaea
Aeronectris
Afeda
Aganoptila
Agonismus
Alloclita
Allotalanta
Amaurogramma
Amblytenes
Ambonostola
Anataractis'AnatrachyntisAnonciaAnorcotaAntequeraAphanosaraAphthonetusApothetodesArchisophaAscaleniaAshibusaAsymphorodesAxiarchaBalionebrisBathraulaBathybaliaBifascioidesBubalocerasCalanesiaCallixestisCalycobathraCholotisChrysopeleiaClemmatistaColonophoraCosmiosophistaCosmopterixCrobylophanesCyphothyrisCystioecetesDhahraniaDiatonicaDiophilaDiplosaraDiversivalvaDorodocaDromiaulisDynatophysisDysphoriaEcballogoniaEchinoscelisEndograptisEraleaErechthiodesEritarbesEteobaleaEuamnerisEuclemensiaEuhyposmocomaEumenodoraEuperissusFalcatariellaGisiliaGlaphyristisGriphocosmaHaplochroisHaplophylaxHarpograptisHedroxenaHelicacmaHerlindaHeterotactisHodgesiellaHomosacesHyalochnaHyperdasysellaHyposmocomaIdiostylaIressaIschnangelaIschnobathraIsidiellaIsostreptisIthomeLabdiaLalliaLeptozestisLimnaeciaMacrobathraMelanocinclisMelanozestisMeleonomaMelneaMeneptilaMetagrypaMicrozestisMinivalvaMothonodesNeachandellaNeelysiaNeomarianiaNepotulaObithomeOpszygaOrthromictaOtonomaPancaliaParastagmatophoraParathystasPassalotisPauroptilaPebopsPechyptilaPerimedePeriplocaPersicoptilaPharmacoptisPhepsalostomaPhosphaticolaPhthoraulaPristenProterocosmaProtogrypaProtorhizaPseudascaleniaPtilocharesPycnagorastisPyretaulaxPyrodercesRamphisRessiaRhadinastisRhinomactrumSathrobrotaScaeosophaScaeothyrisSchendylotisSematoptisSemnoprepiaSemolinaSindicolaSiskiwitiaSorhageniaSorhageniellaSpirotermaStagmatophoraStilbosisStreptothyrisStromatiticaStrophalingiasSynplocaSyntomactisSyntomaulaTanygonaTeladomaThalerostomaThectophilaTolliellaTrachydoraTriclonellaTrissodorisUlochoraUrangelaVulcaniellaWalshiaZanclarches''

References 

Natural History Museum Lepidoptera genus database

Cosmopterigidae
Cosmopterigid genera
Cosmopterigid